The Ackerley Group was an American media company owned by Barry Ackerley that owned several television stations (mainly in New York, California, as well as one in Fairbanks) that was sold to Clear Channel Communications in 2002. In addition to ownership of television stations across the country, the company also owned and operated several radio stations in the Seattle, Washington, market. The company also owned the NBA Seattle SuperSonics and WNBA Seattle Storm professional basketball teams. 

Ackerley announced its sale to Clear Channel Communications on October 8, 2001; the merger was completed on June 14, 2002. At the time of the closure of the transaction, the sale price was reported to be 38 times cashflow (approximately $1.1B USD) the highest ever sale valuation for a North American publicly traded media company in the history of the NYSE. The record setting high price tag was attributed to the overwhelming market monopoly position of the Ackerley Group's Out of Home Media (billboards) marketplace in the Washington, Oregon, Massachusetts and South Florida media markets, all areas where Clear Channel was devoid of inventory. Its chairman was Seattle-based businessman Barry Ackerley. Barry Ackerley and his immediate family owned approximately 82% of the company stock at the time of the sale.

Stations list (incomplete)
Stations are arranged in alphabetical order by state and city of license.

Notes:
1 Divested following purchase of KION, Ackerley continued to operate station after divestiture until the merger with Clear Channel in 2002.
2 Operated by Ackerley from 1994 until purchased outright by Ackerley in 2000.
3 Ackerley never owned this station directly but did operate it through a time brokerage agreement from 2000 until the merger with Clear Channel in 2002.

Notes

Defunct broadcasting companies of the United States
IHeartMedia
Defunct companies based in Seattle
Mass media companies established in 1975
1975 establishments in Washington (state)
Mass media companies disestablished in 2002
2002 disestablishments in Washington (state)
2002 mergers and acquisitions